Boucau is a commune in the Pyrénées-Atlantiques department and Nouvelle-Aquitaine region of south-western France. It is located in the former province of Labourd.

Geography 
Boucau is a part of Gascony. It borders the Landes department. Boucau is within the Bayonne-Biarritz conurbation, and within the Bayonne urban unit. It covers an area of 5.4 km² and had a population of 8,200 at the 2016 Census. The density is 1,337 people per square kilometre. The population has grown by 11% since 1999. Surrounded by Bayonne, Anglet and Tarnos, Boucau is 4 km north-west of Bayonne, the largest city of the surrounding region. The city sits 11 metres above sea level, and the Adour river runs through the town. Boucau station has rail connections to Hendaye, Bayonne and Bordeaux.

Hydrography 
The Adour flows through Boucau before flowing into the Bay of Biscay with Tarnos (Landes) on the left bank and Anglet (Pyrenées-Atlantique) on the right. One of the rivers that flows into the Adour, the stream of the Esbouc Mill, runs through Boucau.

Neighbourhoods 
Boucau is divided into nine neighbourhoods. These are:

 Montespan in the north
 Matignon in the north
 Beyré in the north
 Barthassot in the north
 Lahillade in the centre
 Romatet in the centre
 Picquessary in the centre
 Loustau in the south
 Saint-Gobain in the south

Population

See also
Communes of the Pyrénées-Atlantiques department

References

Communes of Pyrénées-Atlantiques
Pyrénées-Atlantiques communes articles needing translation from French Wikipedia